Godsticks is a British progressive rock band based in Newport, Wales, formed in 2006. Their musical style today can be described as progressive rock or even progressive metal. The band consists of vocalist and guitarist Darran Charles, bassist Dan Nelson, guitarist Gavin Bushell, and drummer Tom Price. The band has released five studio albums and one self-titled EP; Spiral Vendetta, The Envisage Conundrum, Emergence, Faced With Rage and Inescapable.

History

2009 - 2012 
Godsticks burst onto the progressive rock scene back in 2009 with their eclectic self-titled EP. The sheer originality of the music was greeted with enthusiasm by critics and music fans alike, with the band being considered “a refreshing approach to the contemporary music scene”. The original band line-up included founding member Darran Charles, bassist Jason Marsh and drummer Steve Roberts. Roberts was hired by Charles to play on the debut EP and subsequently joined the band. Jason Marsh left the band in late 2009.

In July 2010, the band released their debut full-length album Spiral Vendetta – the culmination of 16 months of writing and a lengthy production process. The extensive production proved worth it as the album received a unanimously positive response, being described as "mesmerising". Jez Rowden of DPRP said: "Spiral Vendetta has it all in spades with chops, emotion, musicality and imagination, the songs pack a breathtaking amount into concise pieces and the album in no way outstays its welcome". New bassist Dan Nelson was brought on board a short time later, having been discovered by Charles via YouTube video Nelson had posted of himself playing a Godsticks tune.

2012 - 2013 
A worldwide distribution deal was secured on the strength of Spiral Vendetta and the band completed a number of tours and festivals, supporting such acts as The Pineapple Thief. In March 2012, Godsticks were also the supporting act on a 5-date UK tour with The Aristocrats; featuring world-renowned guitarist Guthrie Govan, bassist Bryan Beller and drummer Marco Minnemann. The tour was a huge success and introduced the band to a much wider audience.

At the end of that tour the band went into the studio to record The Envisage Conundrum. The recent and extensive live work had influenced the newer material and it became much heavier and more guitar-driven. None of the band's vaunted originality was lost but The Envisage Conundrum represented a more focused and settled band, still offering an eclectic array of songs, but in a much more accessible package.

2013 - 2014 
The Envisage Conundrum was released in 2013 and packed a hard punch in places, whilst maintaining a steady move forward in musicianship and writing. Kerrang Magazine said: "From the stuttering hard rock of Caught In A Bind to epic three-parter Borderstomp's electric jazz, we get flashes of innovation and virtuoso class". In 2013 Godsticks supported ‘The Mike Keneally Band’ on a 13-date tour of Europe and co-headlined a UK tour with ‘Knifeworld’. A three-week European tour in 2014 supporting ‘The Aristocrats’ followed, and that tour in particular indirectly forged a path towards an even heavier sound.

2014 - 2017 
In April 2014, Godsticks continued to explore the heavier side of their musical style and set to work writing their third full-length studio album Emergence (released September 2015). A great deal of research was spent in achieving the sound they had in mind for this album. Drums were tracked at Monnow Valley Studio in November 2014, whose incredible and acclaimed live room provided the perfect foundation for the heavy guitar tracks that were to follow.

Emergence was also produced by James Loughrey (known for his work with acts such as Skindred, Manic Street Preachers and Def Leppard). It received great reviews and signified a milestone in the progression of the band from complex eclectic prog-rock to a more focused, heavier progressive metal style filled with addictive grooves and memorable choruses. Total Guitar Magazine said “Emergence is a rare thing – an album of technically astounding prog-metal replete with hooks and melodies". Typically for Godsticks, who are difficult to pin down to a specific genre, Emergence has been likened to a variety of different bands at the heavier end of the progressive spectrum, including Mastodon, Rush, and Alice in Chains.

Emergence was the last album to feature the three-piece band line-up that had existed since 2010. Just as the album was being released in September 2015, Steve Roberts departed the band and an additional guitarist, Gavin Bushell, joined along with new drummer Tom Price.

The new four-piece line-up started performing together in late 2015, racking up a string of support slots with bands such as Textures, Dorje and Aisles. In 2017, they supported The Pineapple Thief on both European legs of the Your Wilderness Tour, as well as performing at the HRH Prog and Planet RockStock festivals in North and South Wales respectively.

2017 - 2019 
Godsticks subsequently went on to be signed by Kscope records and in October 2017 released one of their most successful albums to date Faced With Rage, in addition to playing headline shows across the UK in 2018. They also performed at the Stone Free festival at The O2 in London and the Prog'Sud Festival in Marseille, France, as well as headlining the very first Fusion Festival in Stourport.

2019 - present 
Their fifth studio album, titled Inescapable, was released on 7 February 2020. A headline UK tour was scheduled to take place in April 2020, along with appearances at international festivals, but all were postponed due to the COVID-19 pandemic. The band will be back on the road in 2021.

References

British progressive metal musical groups
British progressive rock groups
Welsh rock music groups
Musical groups established in 2008